USS Dearborn (PF-33), a , is so far the only ship of the United States Navy to be named for Dearborn, Michigan.

Construction
The ship was laid down on 15 August 1943 by Walter Butler Shipbuilding Company of Superior, Wisconsin, under a Maritime Commission contract, as Toledo.  She was renamed Dearborn and launched on 27 September 1943, sponsored by Mrs. R. C. Dahlinger of Dearborn, Michigan; and commissioned on 10 September 1944.

Service history
Sailing from Boston, Massachusetts, on 3 November 1944, Dearborn arrived at NS Argentia, Newfoundland, four days later for duty on weather patrol.  She had similar duty off Bermuda, as well as plane guard and search and rescue duty until 30 April 1946 when she arrived back at Boston.  On 7 May, she departed for Charleston, South Carolina, arriving there two days later.  Dearborn was decommissioned there on 5 June 1946, and sold on 8 July 1947.

References

External links  
 
hazegray.org: USS Dearborn

Tacoma-class frigates
World War II patrol vessels of the United States
Ships built in Superior, Wisconsin
1943 ships